The Zimbabwe national cricket team toured Kenya in March 1993 and played a limited overs matches against the Kenyan team shortly after they had finished a home series against India.

Only match

References

1993 in Zimbabwean cricket
1993 in Kenyan cricket